James Edward Hamilton, 4th Duke of Abercorn (29 February 1904 – 4 June 1979) styled Viscount Strabane until 1913 and Marquess of Hamilton between 1913 and 1953, was a British peer. He was the son of James Hamilton, 3rd Duke of Abercorn, and Lady Rosalind Cecilia Caroline Bingham. He inherited his father's peerages on 12 September 1953.

Career

The then-Lord Hamilton attended Eton. He was commissioned into the Grenadier Guards, where he rose to the rank of captain. In 1946, he was elected to the County Council of County Tyrone, served as High Sheriff of Tyrone, and then served in the Senate of Northern Ireland. He became Lord Lieutenant of County Tyrone on his father's death, a position he held for the remainder of his life. He was appointed honorary colonel of the 5th Battalion, Royal Inniskilling Fusiliers (a Territorial Army unit), and died at age 75.

Family
In 1928 he married Lady Kathleen Crichton (1905–1990), a daughter of Henry Crichton, Viscount Crichton (1872–1914, son of the 4th and father of the 5th Earl of Erne) and Lady Mary Cavendish Grosvenor (1883–1959, daughter of the 1st Duke of Westminster).

They had two sons and a daughter:
 Lady Moyra Kathleen Hamilton (1930–2020)
James Hamilton, 5th Duke of Abercorn (b. 1934)
Lord Claud Anthony Hamilton (b. 1939), who was appointed Deputy Lieutenant of County Fermanagh in 1978; he was High Sheriff of Fermanagh in 1990 and was made a Justice of the Peace for the county in 1991. In 1982 he married Catherine Janet Faulkner (niece of Lord Faulkner of Downpatrick). They have a son and a daughter.

Ancestry

See also
 List of Northern Ireland Members of the House of Lords

References

External links

 

1904 births
1979 deaths
104
Grenadier Guards officers
High Sheriffs of Tyrone
Lord-Lieutenants of Tyrone
Members of the Senate of Northern Ireland 1949–1953
Members of the Senate of Northern Ireland 1953–1957
Members of the Senate of Northern Ireland 1957–1961
People educated at Eton College
Ulster Unionist Party members of the Senate of Northern Ireland
Ulster Unionist Party hereditary peers